Karel Karafiát (born 21 October 1941) is a Czech rower. He competed in the men's coxed four event at the 1964 Summer Olympics.

References

1941 births
Living people
Czech male rowers
Olympic rowers of Czechoslovakia
Rowers at the 1964 Summer Olympics
Place of birth missing (living people)
European Rowing Championships medalists